Donald "Donnie" Roan Dunagan (born August 16, 1934) is an American former child actor and retired United States Marine Corps major. He is best known for portraying the young son of Baron Frankenstein in Son of Frankenstein and for providing the voice of young Bambi in Bambi (1942).

Biography
Dunagan was born in San Antonio, Texas, United States, but his family soon moved to Memphis, Tennessee, where they struggled with poverty. There, when he was at the age of three-and-a-half, he won a talent contest prize of $100. Spotted by a studio talent scout, the family moved to Hollywood, where Dunagan appeared in a series of films and soon became his family's main breadwinner. After he provided the voice for the titlular character in Walt Disney's Bambi (1942), he retired from voice acting.

By the age of 13, Dunagan lived in a boarding house and worked as a lathe operator. In 1952, at the age of 18, he enlisted in the Marine Corps. He became the Marines' youngest-ever drill instructor and served three tours in Vietnam, where he was wounded several times, before finally retiring with the rank of major in 1977.

For Dunagan's service, he received a Bronze Star and three Purple Hearts. Dunagan kept his acting career a secret while serving in the Marines, but in 2004, he was located and exhaustively interviewed by horror film historian Tom Weaver in a special "Donnie Dunagan issue" of Video Watchdog magazine. He is retired and currently lives in San Angelo, Texas, with his wife.

Filmography
 Mother Carey's Chickens (1938) as Peter Carey (film debut)
 Son of Frankenstein (1939) as Peter von Frankenstein
 The Forgotten Woman (1939) as Terry Kennedy Jr.
 Tower of London (1939) as Baby Prince
 Vigil in the Night (1940) as Tommy (uncredited)
 Meet the Chump (1941) as Little Boy (uncredited)
 Bambi (1942) as Young Bambi (voice, final film role)

References

External links

 

1934 births
Living people
American male child actors
American male voice actors
American male film actors
United States Marine Corps officers
Male actors from Memphis, Tennessee
People from San Angelo, Texas
20th-century American male actors
United States Marine Corps personnel of the Vietnam War
Military personnel from Texas